Olexandr Putsko (born August 4, 1981) is a Ukrainian cross-country skier who has competed since 2000. Competing in two Winter Olympics, he earned his best finish of 52nd twice, both in the 30 km mixed pursuit events (2006, 2010).

Putsko's best finish at the FIS Nordic World Ski Championships was 14th in the 4 x 10 km relay at Val di Fiemme in 2003 while his best individual finish was 15th in the 15 km event at Sapporo in 2007).

His best World cup finish was 14th in 1 4 x 10 km relay at Norway in 2005 while his best individual finish was 48th in a 15 km event at Russia in 2009..

References

1981 births
Cross-country skiers at the 2006 Winter Olympics
Cross-country skiers at the 2010 Winter Olympics
Living people
Olympic cross-country skiers of Ukraine
Ukrainian male cross-country skiers